Kirkland is a village in DeKalb County, Illinois, United States. The population was 1,650 at the 2020 census, down from 1,744 at the 2010 census.

History
A post office called Kirkland has been in operation since 1875. Kirkland was platted in 1876. The village was named for William T. Kirk, a local landowner.

Geography
Kirkland is located at  (42.091306, -88.850345).

Demographics
As of the 2020 census there were 1,650 people, 573 households, and 369 families residing in the village. The racial makeup of the village was 86.67% White, 0.73% African American, 0.36% Native American, 0.18% Asian, 0.12% Pacific Islander, 3.70% from other races, and 8.24% from two or more races. Hispanic or Latino of any race were 10.42% of the population.

There were 573 households, out of which 59.51% had children under the age of 18 living with them, 47.29% were married couples living together, 13.09% had a female householder with no husband present, and 35.60% were non-families. 26.70% of all households were made up of individuals, and 10.12% had someone living alone who was 65 years of age or older. The average household size was 3.25 and the average family size was 2.66.

The village's age distribution consisted of 26.5% under the age of 18, 11.1% from 18 to 24, 24.9% from 25 to 44, 21.5% from 45 to 64, and 16.0% who were 65 years of age or older. The median age was 34.5 years. For every 100 females, there were 92.4 males. For every 100 females age 18 and over, there were 100.4 males.

The median income for a household in the village was $63,708, and the median income for a family was $67,159. Males had a median income of $50,938 versus $25,417 for females. The per capita income for the village was $27,281. About 10.3% of families and 12.8% of the population were below the poverty line, including 19.7% of those under age 18 and 4.9% of those age 65 or over.

References

Villages in DeKalb County, Illinois
Villages in Illinois